Magnetic North Orchestra established in Oslo, Norway (1992–2005) was a Norwegian jazz orchestra, created and led by Jon Balke.  MNO was originally a jazz ensemble inspired by Oslo 13, put together with strings and percussion. As Olympic musical ambassador from 1993 to 1994, for the 1994 Winter Olympics at Lillehammer, Jon Balke created the work Magnetic North for a larger group, and under this name (MNO) he has toured in Europe, USA and Japan.

MNO was further developed with fourteen string musicians from "Stavanger Symfoniorkester" for the production Grand Magnetic (2001), and in a version with the "TrondheimSolistene".  After 2002 they had close cooperation with Balke's band Batagraf. The lineup has varied from seven to thirteen.

Members
Jon Balke (piano, keyboards, percussion, electronics)
Jens Petter Antonsen (trumpet)
Per Jørgensen (trumpet, vocals)
Arve Henriksen (trumpet, vocals)
Fredrik Lundin (bass flute, soprano saxophone, tenor saxophone)
Morten Halle (alto saxophone, flute)
Tore Brunborg (tenor and soprano saxophones)
Gertrud Økland (violin)
Henrik Hannisdal (violin)
Odd Hannisdal (violin)
Bjarte Eike (violin)
Peter Spissky (violin)
Trond Villa (viola)
Marek Konstantynowicz (viola)
Jonas Franke-Blom (violoncello)
Svante Henryson (violoncello)
Morten Hannisdal (violoncello)
Thomas Pitt (bass violin)
Anders Jormin (double bass)
Marilyn Mazur (percussion)
Ingar Zach (percussion)
Helge Norbakken (percussion)
Audun Kleive (drums)

Commissioned Works
Il cenone (Vossajazz, 1992)
Magnetic North (OL Lillehammer, 1994)
Grand Magnetic (Copenhagen, 2001), augmented Magnetic North with a 14-piece string group
ECM Autumn Cycle (Dublin, 2005)

Discography
Further (ECM Records, 1992)
Solarized (Emarcy, 1999)
Kyanos (ECM, 2002)
Diverted travels (ECM, 2004)
Magnetic Works 1993-2001 (ECM, 2012), compilation

On Video
Live in Bruxelles (Prospect Media, 2005), Video documentary
Magnetisk musiker (NRK, 2004), video portrait made by Audun Aagre

References

External links
Magnetic Music Official Website

Musical groups established in 1992
1992 establishments in Norway
Musical groups from Oslo